Ren Junfei (born February 4, 1990) is a Chinese professional basketball player for the Guangdong Southern Tigers of the Chinese Basketball Association (CBA).

He represented China's national basketball team at the 2017 FIBA Asia Cup in Zouk Mikael, Lebanon, where he recorded most minutes and steals for China.

Ren was included in China's squad for the 2023 FIBA Basketball World Cup qualification.

References

External links
2017 FIBA Asia Cup Profile
Asia-basket.com Profile
REAL GM Profile

1990 births
Living people
People from Dongguan
Chinese men's basketball players
Guangdong Southern Tigers players
Centers (basketball)